James Thomas Harding (dates unknown) was an English professional cricketer who made 36 known appearances in first-class cricket matches between 1792 and 1810. He was mainly associated with Surrey sides.

References

English cricketers
English cricketers of 1787 to 1825
Surrey cricketers
Hampshire cricketers
Year of birth unknown
Year of death unknown